Zeiten ändern dich ("[The] Times Change You") is the seventh solo album by German rapper Bushido and also the soundtrack of his movie Zeiten ändern dich. The lead single "Alles wird gut" was released on 5 February 2010 and the second single "Zeiten ändern dich" on 6 August 2010.

Track listing

The limited deluxe edition features a second disc that contains all the instrumentals.

Charts

Weekly charts

Year-end charts

Certifications

References

Bushido (rapper) albums
2009 albums
German-language albums